The United Congress is a South African political party formed by Mluleki George in December 2013. George left the Congress of the People (COPE), accusing its leader Mosiuoa Lekota of ruling the party improperly.

The party formed 13 branches in Mbhashe, and registered to contest a number of by-elections in the area, held in January 2014. The party failed to win a seat, with a best of 6% in one ward, while in another ward the party failed to attract a single vote.

Election results

National elections

Provincial elections

|----- bgcolor="#cccccc"
!rowspan="2"|Election
!colspan="2" |Eastern Cape
!colspan="2" |Free State
!colspan="2" |Gauteng
!colspan="2" |Kwazulu-Natal
!colspan="2" |Limpopo
!colspan="2" |Mpumalanga
!colspan="2" |North-West
!colspan="2" |Northern Cape
!colspan="2" |Western Cape
|-
|----- bgcolor="#cccccc"
|align="center"|%
|Seats
|align="center"|%
|Seats
|align="center"|%
|Seats
|align="center"|%
|Seats
|align="center"|%
|Seats
|align="center"|%
|Seats
|align="center"|%
|Seats
|align="center"|%
|Seats
|align="center"|%
|Seats
|-
|2014
| align="right"|0.06%
| align="right"|0/63
| align="right"|–
| align="right"|–
| align="right"|–
| align="right"|–
| align="right"|–
| align="right"|–
| align="right"|–
| align="right"|–
| align="right"|–
| align="right"|–
| align="right"|–
| align="right"|–
| align="right"|–
| align="right"|–
| align="right"|–
| align="right"|–
|-
|}

References

External links

2013 establishments in South Africa
Political parties established in 2013
Political parties in South Africa
Socialist parties in South Africa